Arsyad Yusgiantoro (born 11 July 1996, in Tulungagung) is an Indonesian professional footballer who plays as a winger for the Liga 1 club Persik Kediri.

Club career
In 2016, Arsyad join Persegres Gresik United for the 2016 Indonesia Soccer Championship A. Arsyad scored for the first time when Persegres went up against Semen Padang FC. He scored a goal in the 49th minutes.

International career 
He was called up for the Indonesian national football team on 21 March 2017 for a friendly match against Myanmar.

Career statistics

Club

Honours

Club 
PSS Sleman
 Menpora Cup third place: 2021

References

External links
 Arysad Yusgiantoro at Soccerway
 Arsyad Yusgiantoro at Liga Indonesia

1996 births
Living people
Indonesian footballers
People from Tulungagung Regency
Indonesian Premier Division players
Liga 1 (Indonesia) players
Pro Duta FC players
Gresik United players
Persegres Gresik players
PSM Makassar players
PSS Sleman players
Persik Kediri players
Association football forwards
Association football wingers
Sportspeople from East Java